Cheongju KB Stars is a professional basketball club in the Women's Korean Basketball League in South Korea.

Honours

Women's Korean Basketball League 

WKBL Championship
 Winners (2): 2018–19, 2021–22
 Runners-up (6): 2002 (winter), 2006 (summer), 2011–12, 2014–15, 2017–18, 2020–21

WKBL Regular Season
 Winners (4): 2002 (winter), 2006 (summer), 2018–19, 2021–22
 Runners-up (5): 2004 (winter), 2005 (summer), 2017–18, 2019–20, 2020–21

External links
 Official website  

Basketball teams established in 1963
Basketball teams in South Korea
Women's basketball teams in South Korea
Women's Korean Basketball League teams
Sport in North Chungcheong Province
1963 establishments in South Korea